The 2009 Welsh Open was a professional ranking snooker tournament that took place between 16 and 22 February 2009 at the Newport Centre in Newport, Wales.

The defending champion was Mark Selby, but he lost in the quarter-finals against Anthony Hamilton. The event was won Ali Carter, who claimed his first ranking tournament win by defeating Joe Swail 9–5 in the final, having come back from 2–5 down. This was the first ranking final refereed by Colin Humphries.

Prize fund
The breakdown of prize money for this year is shown below:

Winner: £35,000
Runner-up: £17,500
Semi-finals: £8,750
Quarter-finals: £6,500
Last 16: £4,275
Last 32: £2,750
Last 48: £1,725
Last 64: £1,325

Stage one highest break: £500
Stage two highest break: £2,000
Stage one maximum break: £1,000
Stage two maximum break: £20,000
Total: £225,500

Main draw

Final

Qualifying
These matches took place between 3 and 6 February 2009 at the Pontins Centre in Prestatyn, Wales.

Century breaks

Qualifying stage centuries

136  Barry Pinches
132  Daniel Wells
132  Stuart Pettman
131, 112, 110  Jamie Burnett
128, 105  Martin Gould
123  Andrew Norman

122, 108  Liang Wenbo
120  Andy Lee
119  Alan McManus
111  Gerard Greene
109  Paul Davison
102  Patrick Wallace

Televised stage centuries

142, 117, 115, 101  Marco Fu
141, 119, 116, 109  Ali Carter
136, 116, 100  Anthony Hamilton
135  Martin Gould
132  Steve Davis
131, 115  David Gilbert
129, 101  John Higgins
126  Mark Selby
124, 107  Neil Robertson
124, 104  Dominic Dale

118  Ronnie O'Sullivan
116, 105  Shaun Murphy
110  Paul Davies
109, 104  Ryan Day
109  Michael Judge
107  Joe Perry
105  Graeme Dott
105  Joe Swail
102  Barry Pinches
101  Stephen Maguire

References

Welsh Open (snooker)
Welsh Open
Open (snooker)
Welsh Open snooker in Newport